Goriče is a village west of Postojna in the Inner Carniola region of Slovenia.

Church

The local church in the settlement is dedicated to Saint Peter and belongs to the Parish of Hrenovice.

References

External links

Goriče on Geopedia

Populated places in the Municipality of Postojna